Jörgen Henri Raymann (born 13 August 1966) is a Dutch-Surinamese cabaretier, stand-up comedian, actor and presenter. 

In 2021, he appeared in the television show De Verraders.

Jörgen Raymann was born in Amsterdam and raised in Paramaribo. He is partly of Sephardi Jewish descent.

Filmography

References

External links 
 

1966 births
Living people
Dutch cabaret performers
Dutch male actors
Dutch male film actors
Dutch people of Jewish descent
Dutch people of Surinamese descent
Dutch stand-up comedians
Dutch television personalities
Dutch television presenters
Entertainers from Amsterdam
People from Paramaribo
People of Sephardic-Jewish descent